Hakea ilicifolia is an open shrub or tree in the family Proteacea and is endemic to Western Australia. It is a small, dense shrub with stiff, lobed leaves and clusters of yellow or creamy-white flowers.

Description
The flowers are in a branching corymb with the foliage thickest at the apex. The branchlets are covered with rusty to woolly white soft, matted hairs.

Taxonomy and naming
Hakea ilicifolia was first formally described  in 1810 by Robert Brown and the description was published in Transactions of the Linnean Society of London. It was named from the genus Ilex - holly and the Latin folium - leaf, referring to the holly-shaped leaves.

Distribution and habitat
Holly-leaved hakea is endemic to a few isolated areas in the Wheatbelt, Great Southern and Goldfields-Esperance regions of Western Australia. It has a scattered distribution between Denmark in the south and west, Dumbleyung in the north and Esperance in the east where it is found on breakaway slopes and near creeks growing in sandy, loamy or clay soils over sandstone or laterite and a part of heathland or low Eucalypt woodland communities.

Conservation status
Hakea ilicifolia is classified as "not threatened" by the Western Australian Government Department of Parks and Wildlife.

References

ilicifolia
Eudicots of Western Australia
Plants described in 1810
Taxa named by Robert Brown (botanist, born 1773)